Sucra was a defunct Norwegian holding company that was created in 2001 to own the alcoholic beverage producer and importer Arcus after it had been privatized. Sucra's main owners were Tine, Gilde, Norske Potetindustrier and Ekjord. Sucra bought 66% of Arcus in 2001 and the rest of the company in 2003. In 2005 Sucra and Arcus were sold to the Swedish investment company Ratos.

Holding companies of Norway
Companies based in Oslo
Holding companies established in 2001
Holding companies disestablished in 2005
2001 establishments in Norway
2005 disestablishments in Norway